This is a list  of notable footballers who have played for Clube de Regatas do Flamengo since the foundation of its football team in 1912.

The list comprises those players who have made 100 or more first-team appearances for the club including substitutions.

To see a list of all Flamengo players, major or minor, with a Wikipedia article, see Category:Clube de Regatas do Flamengo footballers.

List of players

Key
Players are listed according to the date of their first-team debut for the club.
First team appearances include: Campeonato Carioca, Campeonato Brasileiro, Copa do Brasil, Torneio Rio – São Paulo, Taça Brasil, Torneio Roberto Gomes Pedrosa, Copa Libertadores, Copa Sudamericana, Copa Mercosur, Supercopa Libertadores, Cope de Oro, Intercontinental Cup, FIFA Club World Cup and friendlies for players prior to the 21st century.

Players in bold currently still play for the club.
Players in italic currently still play professional football.

Table of notable players with 100+ appearances for Flamengo
Statistics correct as of match played 22 November 2022.

Table of notable players with 200+ appearances for Flamengo
Statistics correct as of match played 25 February 2023.

Table of notable players with 300+ appearances for Flamengo
Statistics correct as of match played 25 February 2023.

Table of notable players with 400+ appearances for Flamengo
Statistics correct as of match played 22 November 2022.

Table of notable players with 500+ appearances for Flamengo
Statistics correct as of match played 22 November 2022.

References

External links
 Fla-Estatística – The virtual museum of C.R. Flamengo

 
Association football player non-biographical articles

ru:Список наиболее значимых игроков ФК «Фламенго»